Ever since 1970, the Conservatives had held the mayor's position in Hørsholm Municipality. The municipality is one of the strongest areas of the blue bloc, having voted for parties of the bloc by 69.3% in the 2019 Danish general election, the highest percentage of any municipality.

In the 2017 election, Morten Slotved had led the Conservatives to 8 seats, and had eventually won the mayor's position.

In this election, Venstre would write local history, having won 7 seats the same as the Conservatives, marking the first time that the Conservatives would not become the sole largest party in the municipal council. With both parties being equally large, a dramatic battle over the mayor's position was possible. The result would see the Conservatives once again secure the mayor's position, however they used the support of the red bloc.

Electoral system
For elections to Danish municipalities, a number varying from 9 to 31 are chosen to be elected to the municipal council. The seats are then allocated using the D'Hondt method and a closed list proportional representation.
Hørsholm Municipality had 19 seats in 2021

Unlike in Danish General Elections, in elections to municipal councils, electoral alliances are allowed.

Electoral alliances  

Electoral Alliance 1

Electoral Alliance 2

Results

Notes

References 

Hørsholm